Lincolnwood Town Center is a shopping mall located in Lincolnwood, Illinois. Opened in 1990, the mall's anchor stores are Kohl's, TheRoomPlace, and Old Navy. The mall is owned and managed by Friedman Real Estate.

History

The site of Lincolnwood Town Center was formerly occupied by the headquarters of Bell & Howell. Developers Melvin Simon & Associates (now known as Simon Property Group and Chicago-based Hawthorn Realty first proposed to build a  mall on the site in 1985, but the plan was turned down by city trustees. A second plan, calling for a smaller shopping mall and offices, was approved in 1987.

Upon opening in 1990, the mall featured two anchor stores, both of which were Chicago-based department stores: Madigan's and Carson Pirie Scott (later known as Carson's), with space for up to 90 mall shops within  of total shop space. Representatives of Melvin Simon & Associates noted that the mall's development was indicative of a trend toward building malls within urban settings as opposed to suburbs.

Madigan's closed in 1991 after only a year in business, and was replaced that same year by J. C. Penney. This store was closed in 2001, and in 2002, it was converted to Kohl's.

In 2018, the Carson's store was shuttered following the bankruptcy of parent company The Bon-Ton. Following this announcement, an article published by RE Journal analyzed several Chicago-area malls which were all about to lose a Carson's store, and noted that Lincolnwood Town Center posed a risk of tenancy loss given its smaller size compared to other area malls.

TheRoomPlace opened in the former Carson's spot in August 2019.

Bus routes 
CTA
82 Kimball-Homan
96 Lunt (Weekdays only)
Pace
210 Lincoln Avenue 
290 Touhy Avenue

References

External links
http://lincolnwoodtowncenter.com (Official Website)

Shopping malls in Cook County, Illinois
1990 establishments in Illinois
Shopping malls established in 1990